is a railway station  in the city of Hirosaki, Aomori Prefecture, Japan, jointly operated by East Japan Railway Company (JR East) and the private railway operator Kōnan Railway. It is also a freight terminal for the Japan Freight Railway Company.

Lines

Limited express trains
Hirosaki Station is served by the following limited express train services.
 Tsugaru ( - )
 Akebono overnight sleeper service ( - )
 Nihonkai overnight sleeper service ( - )

Station layout
Hirosaki Station is an elevated station. The JR portion has a single side platform and an island platform, serving three tracks, and the Kōnan Railway has a bay platform serving another two tracks. The station has a JR East Midori no Madoguchi staffed ticket office and View Plaza travel agency.

JR East platforms

Konan Railway platforms

History
Hirosaki Station opened on December 1, 1894. On September 7, 1927, the Konan Railway also began operations at Hirosaki Station. The station building was again reconstructed in 1981 to incorporate a shopping center. With the privatization of JNR on April 1, 1987, the station came under the operational control of JR East. A new station building was completed in December 2004.

Passenger statistics
In fiscal 2018, the JR East station was used by an average of 4,497 passengers daily (boarding passengers only). The Konan Railway station was used by an average of 2,851 passengers daily in fiscal 2011. The JR East passenger figures for previous years are as shown below.

Surrounding area
Hirosaki Post office
Hirosakiekimae Post Office
Hirosaki Bus terminal

Bus services

Local services
Kōnan Bus
For Karekitaira via Dake hot spring
For Fujishiro via Hamanomashi or Komagoshi
For Goshogawara Station via Fujisaki, Itayanagi and Tsuruta
For Namioka via Fujisaki
For Kuroishi Station via Inakadate
For Koguriyama via Hirosaki University
For Sōma via Akudo
For Tashiro via Kuniyoshi
For Aomori Airport (Express bus)

Long-distance bus services
 (operated by Kōnan Bus, JR Bus Tohoku, Iwate-Kenpoku Bus, and Iwate-Kenkōtsu)
For Morioka Station

See also
 List of Railway Stations in Japan

References

External links

 JR East station information page 
 Konan Railway station information 

Railway stations in Aomori Prefecture
Ōu Main Line
Konan Railway
Stations of East Japan Railway Company
Stations of Japan Freight Railway Company
Hirosaki
Railway stations in Japan opened in 1894